I Dream Too Much is a 1935 American romantic comedy film directed by John Cromwell. It stars Henry Fonda, Lily Pons, and Lucille Ball in one of her earlier roles. It has been described as a "somewhat wispy operetta."  Songs are by Jerome Kern and Dorothy Fields. The film was nominated for an Academy Award in the category Sound Recording (Carl Dreher).

Plot 

Annette Monard Street (Lily Pons) is an aspiring singer, who falls in love with and marries Jonathan Street (Henry Fonda), a struggling young composer.

Jonathan pushes her into a singing career, and she soon becomes a star. Meanwhile, Jonathan is unable to sell his music, and he finds himself jealous of his wife's success.

Concerned about their relationship, Annette uses her influence to get Jonathan's work turned into a musical comedy. Once she achieves this, she then retires from public life in order to raise a family.

Cast 
 Lily Pons as Annette Monard Street
 Henry Fonda as Jonathan 'Johnny' Street
 Eric Blore as Roger Briggs
 Osgood Perkins as Paul Darcy
 Lucien Littlefield as Hubert Dilley, Tourist
 Lucille Ball as Gwendolyn Dilley, Tourist
 Mischa Auer as Darcy's Pianist
 Paul Porcasi as Uncle Tito
 Scotty Beckett as Boy on Merry-Go-Round

Reception
Writing for The Spectator in 1936, Graham Greene gave the film a poor review. Greene criticized Jerome Kern's musical score as "pompous and middle-aged" in contrast to the times which were more in line with fresh musicians like Cole Porter; he did compare Pons favorably to Grace Moore, describing her personality as "less ponderous". The only portion of the film that Greene found to provide a light touch was that of the performing seal.

The film recorded a loss of $350,000.

References

External links
 
 
 
 
 

1935 films
Films directed by John Cromwell
American black-and-white films
RKO Pictures films
1935 romantic comedy films
1935 musical comedy films
American romantic musical films
Films about composers
1930s romantic musical films
1930s English-language films
1930s American films